The 2017–18 Northern Arizona Lumberjacks women's basketball team represents Northern Arizona University during the 2017–18 NCAA Division I women's basketball season. The Lumberjacks, led by first year head coach Loree Payne, play their home games at the Walkup Skydome. They were members of the Big Sky Conference. They finished the season 7–23, 3–15 in Big Sky to finish in eleventh place. They lost in the first round of the Big Sky women's tournament to Portland State.

Roster

Schedule

|-
!colspan=9 style=| Non-conference regular season

|-
!colspan=9 style=| Big Sky regular season

|-
!colspan=9 style=| Big Sky Women's Tournament

See also
2017–18 Northern Arizona Lumberjacks men's basketball team

References

Northern Arizona
Northern Arizona Lumberjacks women's basketball seasons